The second-system effect or second-system syndrome is the tendency of small, elegant, and successful systems to be succeeded by over-engineered, bloated systems, due to inflated expectations and overconfidence.

The phrase was first used by Fred Brooks in his book The Mythical Man-Month, first published in 1975. It described the jump from a set of simple operating systems on the IBM 700/7000 series to OS/360 on the 360 series, which happened in 1964.

See also 

 Anti-pattern
 Feature creep
 Inner-platform effect
 Osborne effect
 Sophomore slump
 Unix philosophy

References

External links 
 
 
 
 

Software quality